The Two Groups Islands is a minor subgroup of the Tuamotus in French Polynesia. It is formed by the atolls of Marokau to the north (populated by 100 people) and the uninhabited Ravahere to the south.

History
These two neighboring atolls were discovered by Louis Antoine de Bougainville in 1768. It was James Cook, however, who named them "Two Groups" the following year. He described Marokau and Revahere as a "chain of islands linked by reefs".

Administration
Administratively the Two Groups Islands belong form the territory of  the associated commune of Marokau, itself part of the commune of Hikueru, which consists of the two atolls of the Two Groups Islands (Marokau and Ravahere) and the three atolls of the associated commune of Hikueru (Hikueru, Reitoru and Tekokota).

References

External links
Photos
 

Atolls of the Tuamotus
Archipelagoes of the Pacific Ocean